Shorea kudatensis (also called seraya kuning kudat) is a species of tree in the family Dipterocarpaceae. It is endemic to Borneo, in low coastal hills of the north and west of Malaysian Sabah.

The species has lost approximately 90% of its natural habitat and is listed as Near Threatened on the IUCN Red List.

References

kudatensis
Endemic flora of Borneo
Trees of Borneo
Flora of Sabah
Taxonomy articles created by Polbot